The Brownsville Charros were a minor league baseball team, based in Brownsville, Texas. The team played as the Brownsville Brownies from 1910-1911 in the Southwest Texas League before shutting down. They were revived in 1928 and then became the Charros in 1938 in the Texas Valley League. The team returned again in 1939 as part of the Rio Grande Valley League and moved to the Gulf Coast League in 1951.

A new team by the same name began in 2014 as part of the United League Baseball.  The team finished its season on August 15, 2014 with its last game on the road against the Fort Worth Cats.  The team was managed by former Major League Baseball player Ozzie Canseco.

External links
Baseball Reference
Brownsville Charros United League Baseball website
Game recap of last Charros 2014 game

Defunct Rio Grande Valley League teams
Defunct Texas Valley League teams
Defunct Southwest Texas League teams
Defunct Florida Complex League teams
Defunct baseball teams in Texas
Baseball teams disestablished in 1953
Baseball teams established in 1910
Texas Valley League teams